Wilkins House is a building that was listed as a Los Angeles Historic-Cultural Monument in 2007. The LA Office of Historic Resources described it upon designation as...

References

External links

Los Angeles Historic-Cultural Monuments
Highland Park, Los Angeles
Houses in Los Angeles
1911 establishments in California